Angela McEwan (April 23, 1934 – December 20, 2015) was an American actress, best known for her roles in Nebraska and Getting On. She also appeared in Parks and Recreation and New Girl.

Early years
McEwan was born in Santa Monica, California on April 23, 1934. She studied acting at the Los Angeles City College for one year, then transferred to the University of California at Los Angeles, where she met and married her husband, Nicaraguan gastroenterologist Guillermo McEwan. They moved to Mexico City, where he continued his medical studies and began his career. After returning to California via Temple, Texas, where she received a bachelor's degree from the University of Mary Hardin–Baylor, McEwan obtained a master's degree in Spanish from University of California, Irvine and worked as an interpreter in criminal court.

Career
When her husband died in 2009, McEwan decided to make another attempt at an acting career, working on multiple television shows before landing a film role in Nebraska.

Death
McEwan died in Long Beach, California on December 20, 2015, aged 81, from lung cancer. Survivors included two sons and three grandchildren.

Filmography

References

External links
 

1934 births
2015 deaths
American television actresses
21st-century American actresses
American film actresses
Actresses from Santa Monica, California
Deaths from lung cancer in California
American expatriates in Mexico
Spanish–English translators
Los Angeles City College alumni
University of California, Los Angeles alumni
University of California, Irvine alumni
University of Mary Hardin–Baylor alumni
20th-century American translators
20th-century American actresses